The Adventures of Buratino may refer to:
The Golden Key, or the Adventures of Buratino
The Adventures of Buratino (1959 film)
The Adventures of Buratino (1975 film)
, a 1993 Russian computer game